Dick Green is a baseball player.

Dick Green may also refer to:

Charlotte and Dick Green, enslaved frontier people of Bent's Fort
Dick Green (rugby league)
Dick Green, businessman and congressional candidate, see United States House of Representatives elections in Illinois, 2010
Dick Green, British musician in Biff Bang Pow!

See also
Richard Green (disambiguation)